Liaochelys is an extinct genus of macrobaenid turtle which existed in western Liaoning, China during the early Cretaceous epoch. It was first named by Chang-Fu Zhou in 2010 and the type species is Liaochelys jianchangensis.

References

Cryptodira
Early Cretaceous turtles
Early Cretaceous reptiles of Asia
Fossil taxa described in 2010
Prehistoric turtle genera
Extinct turtles